Walter Endrizzi is a Paralympic athlete from Italy competing mainly in category T46 long-distance events.

Biography
He competed in the 2008 Summer Paralympics in Beijing, China.  There he won a bronze medal in the men's Marathon - T46 event

External links
 

Paralympic athletes of Italy
Athletes (track and field) at the 2008 Summer Paralympics
Paralympic bronze medalists for Italy
Italian male long-distance runners
Year of birth missing (living people)
Living people
Italian male marathon runners
Medalists at the 2008 Summer Paralympics
Paralympic medalists in athletics (track and field)